Jason Wong is a British actor, known for his role as Kai in the 2018 ITV series Strangers.

Career 
In 2012, Wong was cast on the American Broadcasting Company series Missing.

In 2014, he co-starred the feature film Jarhead 2: Field of Fire.

Wong also starred in the crime-drama Panic with David Gyasi, released in 2016, and has appeared in the crime drama Strangers, broadcast on ITV in 2018.

He appeared in the Channel 4 miniseries Chimerica,  released in the spring of 2019, and played the role of Phuc in  The Gentlemen, which was theatrically released in 2020.

He joined BBC's Silent Witness in 2021 for Series 24 only as regular Adam Yuen. On 13 May 2021, Wong was cast as Dralas in Dungeons & Dragons: Honor Among Thieves.

References

External links
 
 
 

21st-century English male actors
Living people
1986 births
Male actors from London
British people of Chinese descent